SmugMug is a paid image sharing, image hosting service, and online video platform on which users can upload photos and videos. The company also facilitates the sale of digital and print media for amateur and professional photographers. On April 20, 2018, SmugMug purchased Flickr from Oath Inc.

History

SmugMug was founded by son and father team Don and Chris MacAskill and launched on November 3, 2002.

The company was started without any venture capital funding, and for a time was run out of the MacAskill family home. In a 2007 article, the Los Angeles Times wrote:

In 2010, two petabytes of photos were stored on the Amazon S3 service.

On April 20, 2018, SmugMug acquired Flickr from Oath Inc.

Features
SmugMug offers four different account levels, each with a different subset of features.

Privacy and security
SmugMug has options to allow control over the privacy and security of published photos. It has support for both account-level and gallery-level passwords, as well as hidden galleries.

There is also a friends and family social networking service for members of the service to use, which allows for sharing of photos only to people known to the publisher.

Professional services
In conjunction with its print service, SmugMug has a service aimed at professional photographers. Professional accounts have the ability to add custom digital watermarkings to their photos. They can also sell prints and digital downloads of their photos through the SmugMug interface with their own pricing.

See also
 Image hosting service
 Image sharing
 List of image-sharing websites

References

External links

 

2002 establishments in California
Image-sharing websites
Internet properties established in 2002
Online companies of the United States
American photography websites
Technology companies based in the San Francisco Bay Area
Companies based in Mountain View, California